A fleet submarine is a submarine with the speed, range, and endurance to operate as part of a navy's battle fleet.  Examples of fleet submarines are the British First World War era K class and the American World War II era Gato class.

The term has survived in Britain to refer to modern nuclear-powered attack submarines. In the United States Navy, the term came to be used primarily for the long-range submarines that served in World War II.

Examples

United States 
The term was used by the United States Navy to distinguish submarines suitable for long range patrols in the Pacific Ocean from earlier classes such as the United States S-class submarines. The initial goal, pursued with frequent interruptions since the AA-1-class (aka T-class) launched 1918–19, was to produce a submarine with a surfaced speed of 21 knots to operate with the Standard-type battleships of the surface fleet. Most of the nine "V-boats" launched 1924-33 (V-1 through V-6) were either attempts to produce a fleet submarine or were long-range submarine cruisers. These qualities also proved important in the Pacific commerce raiding of World War II, but the 1922 Washington Naval Treaty's prohibition on unrestricted submarine warfare precluded inter-war planning in this area. Although the Gato-class was considered the fully developed archetype, the earlier Porpoise, Salmon, Sargo and Tambor-classes were incrementally improved prototypes distinctly different from the two contemporary experimental Mackerel-class coastal submarines. The Tambors were fully developed and similar to the Gatos except for diving depth and separation of the engines into two compartments.

Japanese 
Japanese I-boats were a conceptually similar long-range differentiation from smaller "medium" or "sea-going" Ro-boats, although some I-boats had features like aircraft hangars and large-caliber deck guns more often associated with submarine cruisers.

British 
In order to get the speeds - over 20 knots while surfaced - required to match their capital ships and to be able to screen ahead of the fleet or flank the enemy, the British initially used steam propulsion. The K-class entering service in 1916 were large for their time. Although able to reach 24 knots the complexity of shutting down boilers and stowing funnels made them slow to dive.

As the speed of capital ships increased, the United Kingdom abandoned the fleet submarine concept following completion of three 21-knot River-class submarine submarines of the early 1930s using supercharged diesels, because the size required for range and surface speed decreased maneuverability.

Others 
Continental European nations sometimes used the terms "ocean-going", "long-patrol", "type 1" or "1st class" submarines, generally referring to Atlantic or Indian Ocean operations in the absence of anticipated need for Pacific patrols, and often without the speed for fleet operations.

Comparison of World War II submarines

References

Sources
 
 
 
 
 
 
 
 
 
 

Submarines by type